The Jule Collins Smith Museum of Fine Art is an art museum on the campus of Auburn University, and is the only accredited university art museum in Alabama. Opened on October 3, 2003, the Jule Collins Smith Museum of Fine Art contains six exhibition galleries within its  of interior space. In addition to the galleries, the museum facility includes an auditorium, cafe, and museum shop. Outside the main building, the grounds encompass  of land, featuring an English-inspired formal area and woodland landscape, outdoor sculpture, and landscaped walking paths around the lake.

In spring of 2013, the American Alliance of Museums recognized the museum as an accredited museum. Accreditation is the highest industry standard for educational exhibitions and programming, operations, and collections stewardship. Approximately six-percent of the nation's museums are accredited.

The museum is named after Jule Collins Smith, the wife of Albert Smith, who graduated from Auburn University in 1947. Smith donated $3 million to the project as a gift to his wife, in honor of their 50th wedding anniversary.

Exhibits

Permanent collection

The museum's permanent collection focuses mainly on 19th and 20th century American and European Art.  The museum includes works by Romare Bearden, Ralston Crawford, Arthur Dove, Georgia O'Keeffe, Jacob Lawrence, John Marin, and Ben Shahn within its Advancing American Art collection. Within the museum's Louise Hauss and David Brent Miller Audubon Collection are 114 prints by naturalist John James Audubon. In addition, the museum contains the Bill L. Harbert Collection of European Art, which features works by Marc Chagall, Salvador Dalí, Henri Matisse, Joan Miró, Pablo Picasso, and Pierre-Auguste Renoir.

Exhibition highlights

In addition to its exhibitions of works in the permanent collection, Jule Collins Smith Museum of Fine Art organizes exhibitions and secures collection loans with significant historic value for special presentations. Past exhibition highlights include Face to Face: Artists’ Self-Portraits from the Collection of Jackye and Curtis Finch Jr., John Himmelfarb: TRUCKS, Rembrandt, Rubens, Gainsborough and the Golden Age of Painting in Europe, Shared Vision: The Sondra Gilman and Celso Gonzalez-Falla Collection of Photography, Tamarind Touchstones: Fabulous at Fifty Celebrating Excellence in Fine Art Lithography and Art Interrupted: Advancing American Art and the Politics of Cultural Diplomacy.

Each year, the museum presents the 1072 Society Exhibition, featuring potential acquisitions to the permanent collection. Out of the Box: A Juried Sculpture Exhibition is a biennial competition that began in 2013 in celebration of the museum’s tenth anniversary. The program continues in its goal of presenting engaging and educational works of art to the university audience and broader community, as well as actively pursuing the growth of the permanent collection of outdoor sculpture. As a part of the university, the museum partners triennially with the College of Liberal Arts for the Auburn University Department of Art and Art History Exhibition.

The museum participates in the North American Reciprocal Museums program, the Southeastern Reciprocal Membership program, and the Museum Travel Alliance.  The museum holds memberships in the American Alliance of Museums, the Southeastern Museums Conference, the Association of Art Museum Directors.

References

External links

The Quilts of Gee’s Bend in context. Auburn University’s program in Women’s Studies

Auburn University
Art museums and galleries in Alabama
Buildings and structures in Auburn, Alabama
University museums in Alabama
Art museums established in 2003
2003 establishments in Alabama
Sculpture gardens, trails and parks in the United States